Ellesmere Port Stadium was a greyhound racing, football and speedway stadium on Thornton Road, Ellesmere Port, in the Wirral, Cheshire, England.

Origins
The track was constructed in the late 1960s, west of the Shropshire Union Canal and east of Cow Worth Grange and Thornton Road.

Greyhound racing
Greyhound racing started on 29 February 1988 and the first race was won by Go Ben Go. The greyhound racing was independent (not affiliated to the sports governing body the National Greyhound Racing Club) and was known as a flapping track, which was the nickname given to independent tracks.

Racing took place on Monday and Saturday evenings. The track circumference was 410 yards, with original race distances of 310, 525, 650 and 710 yards. The hare system was an 'Inside Sumner' and the track had long straights and exceptionally wide bends. The main annual events were the Cheshire Oaks and Whitbread Open.

Race distances were changed to 265 and 470 metres before the track underwent major renovation. In 2013, £170,000 was spent in upgrading the facilities of the 2,000-capacity stadium.

Speedway
Speedway took place from 1972 until 1982, and again in 1985.

Football
Football teams that played at the stadium included Ellesmere Port Town F.C., Ellesmere Port & Neston F.C. and Colwyn Bay F.C.

Closure
The stadium closed in the spring of 2014 and in 2016 plans were passed to build 141 homes on the site.

References

Defunct football venues in England
Defunct greyhound racing venues in the United Kingdom
Defunct speedway venues in England
Sport in Ellesmere Port